Heaux Tales is an EP by American R&B singer Jazmine Sullivan. Released by RCA Records on January 8, 2021, it was her first project since 2015's critically-acclaimed Reality Show. It includes features from Ari Lennox, Anderson .Paak, and H.E.R. The EP was primarily recorded in Sullivan's Philadelphia home.

The project has also been variably identified as a "concept album" and "schematic, a successor to didactic concept albums like The Miseducation of Lauryn Hill". Structurally, six "spoken word interludes" "are followed by songs that flesh them out as character studies". The themes explored include feminism, sexuality, classism, and body-shaming among other lyrical topics supported by narrative interludes between each song. The project received widespread critical acclaim and was also a commercial success, debuting at number four on the US Billboard 200 chart, marking Sullivan's highest position on the chart.

Heaux Tales won the Album of the Year award at the 2021 BET Awards and the 2021 Soul Train Music Awards; it was named Album of the Year by NPR, Entertainment Weekly, LA Times and Pitchfork. The EP won Best R&B Album at the 64th Grammy Awards, and its single "Pick Up Your Feelings" was nominated for both Best R&B Song and won for Best R&B Performance. The project will be further promoted by The Heaux Tales Tour in 2022, Sullivan's third US headlining tour. Sullivan released the deluxe edition of the project, titled Heaux Tales, Mo' Tales: The Deluxe, on February 11, 2022.

Background

Since establishing her recording career in 2008, Sullivan has been known to take long hiatuses between releases. According to Revolt, Sullivan explained the inspiration behind the project in a video:

Complex magazine reports that Dev Hynes, Key Wane, DZL, and others contributed to the production on the project. The promotional rollout for Heaux Tales included the premiere of her installment of NPR's Tiny Desk Concerts series on January 8, 2021. Sullivan stated in an interview with NPR Music, "particularly on this project, I was influenced by a few women today that I felt like were busting through those barriers and helping me to feel more confident in who I am," citing artists Cardi B and Lizzo.

Singles 
The first single, an acoustic ballad titled "Lost One", was released August 28, 2020 and peaked at number 9 on Billboards US Hot R&B Songs. The second single was "Pick Up Your Feelings", released November 20, 2020. In place of a traditional music video, RCA Records released a live acoustic performance. The song has since reached number 1 on Billboards Adult R&B Airplay Chart and number 9 on the R&B/Hip-Hop airplay chart. The song also peaked at number 75 on the Billboard Hot 100. Both singles were performed on BET during the Soul Train Music Awards on November 29, 2020. Sullivan released her third single, "Girl like Me", featuring H.E.R., on January 6, 2021, marking the first time she has ever duetted with a woman on one of her own recordings. The song debuted and peaked at number 96 on the Billboard Hot 100 and at number 29 on Billboards Hot R&B/Hip-Hop Songs chart. "On It," duet with Ari Lennox, also peaked at number 40 on Billboards Hot R&B/Hip-Hop and R&B/Hip-Hop airplay charts despite not being released as a single.

Critical reception

Heaux Tales received a score of 81 out of 100 from review aggregate site Metacritic based on nine reviews, indicating "universal acclaim". Vulture lauded its displays of women's strength as seen in its "interludes [with] women like fellow singer Ari Lennox talking about femininity and sexual empowerment." Alex Suskind of Entertainment Weekly called the project "a punchy concept album that tackles blissful romance, sexual freedom — and the complex moments that arise between." Bobby Carter of NPR hailed it "a bold and timely conversation piece addressing truths regarding relationships, sex, social norms, self-worth and a myriad of other topics that women grapple with." Wongo Okon of Uproxx praised it for casting "a light on the goalpost-shifting standards of this patriarchal society" while holding "the characteristics to be labeled a classic in the future." Mankaprr Conteh of Pitchfork gave the EP the site's Best New Music distinction.

Accolades

Commercial performance
Heaux Tales debuted at number four on the US Billboard 200 chart, earning 43,000 album-equivalent units (including 7,000 copies as pure album sales) in its first week, according to MRC Data. This became Sullivan's second US top-ten album (following 2008's Fearless) and her highest-charting album in the US. The album also debuted at number one on the US Top R&B Albums and number two on the US Top R&B/Hip-Hop Albums charts. It also accumulated a total of 46 million on-demand streams of the project's songs that week. On September 6, 2022, the EP was certified Gold by the RIAA.

Track listing

Personnel 
Credits adapted from Tidal.

Musicians

 Jon L. Smith – bass 
 Antoinette Henry – vocals 
 Ari Lennox – vocals 
 Donna Anderson – vocals 
 Anitra Sasser – vocals 
 Cheryl White – vocals 
 Rashida Northington – vocals 
 Jermaine Blandford – bass 
 Precious Daughtry – vocals 
 Sam Wishkoski – strings 
 Amanda Henderson – vocals 
 Isaac Wriston – bass 

Technical

 Jazmine Sullivan – executive producer
 Dave Kutch – mastering engineer
 Erik Madrid – mixing engineer 
 Manny Marroquin – mixing engineer 
 Chris Galland – mixing engineer 
 Joe Gallagher – mixing engineer , engineer  
 Justin Miller – engineer 
 Ben Thomas – engineer 
 Owen Modamwen – engineer 
 Dave Watson – engineer 
 Jhair "JHA" Lazo – engineer 
 Miki Tsutsumi – engineer  
 Dave "Pop" Watson– recording engineer 
 Aaron Mattes – assistant engineer 
 Jeremie Inhaber – assistant engineer 
 Scott Desmarais – assistant engineer 
 Alex Pyle – assistant engineer

Charts

Weekly charts

Year-end charts

Certifications

References

2021 albums
Jazmine Sullivan albums
RCA Records albums
Albums produced by Cardiak
Albums produced by Dev Hynes
Albums produced by Key Wane
Contemporary R&B albums
Grammy Award for Best R&B Album